Mbandjock is a city located in the Centre Province of Cameroon.

See also
Communes of Cameroon

Populated places in Centre Region (Cameroon)